Sort may refer to:
 Sorting, any process of arranging items in sequence or in sets
 Sorting algorithm, any algorithm for arranging elements in lists
 Sort (Unix), a Unix utility which sorts the lines of a file
 Sort (C++), a function in the C++ Standard Template Library 
 SORT (journal),  peer-reviewed open access scientific journal
 Sort (mathematical logic), a domain in a many-sorted structure
 Sort (typesetting), a piece of metal type
 Sort, Lleida, a town in Catalonia
 Special Operations Response Team, a group trained to respond to disturbances at a correctional facility
 Strategic Offensive Reductions Treaty, a treaty between the United States and the Russian Federation
 Symantec Operations Readiness Tools, a web-based suite of services from Symantec Corporation

See also
 Many-sorted logic
 Check weigher, an automatic machine for checking the weight of packaged commodities
 qsort, a sorting function in the C standard library